The Men's 1 metre springboard competition at the 2019 World Aquatics Championships was held on 12 and 14 July 2019.

Results
The preliminary round was started on 12 July at 11:00. The final was started on 14 July at 15:30.

Green denotes finalists

References

Men's 1 metre springboard